was a Japanese actress. Her life story was adapted into the TV Tokyo program .

Biography

Ohara was born in Tokyo in 1946 to a family that sold Japanese confectionery in the Hongo area. Upon graduating from high school, she made her debut as an actress.  She appeared in what came to be called “trendy” dramas, including “Rikon Tomodachi” with actor Masakazu Tamura and “Kurenaizoku no Hanran.” She was voted “the most adored actress” 14 times.

She married twice, both times ending in divorce. Her first husband was actor Tsunehiko Watase whom she co-starred with; their marriage lasted five years. Two years later, in 1980, she married singer Shinichi Mori. She divorced four years later. In summer of 1975 she was diagnosed with Guillain–Barré syndrome. She underwent surgery for breast cancer at the age of 46, and suffered from depression when her doctor, who had given her much emotional support, died.

On August 6, 2009 the actress was found dead in the bedroom of her home in Setagaya. Worried relatives had contacted the police when no one could reach her for two weeks. She had been dead for several days.

Filmography

Film

Iro (1965)
Kamo (1965) - Yuki Murai
Abashiri bangaichi: Hokkai hen (1965)
Yoru no mesuinu (1966)
Hikô shôjo Yôko (1966) - Ako
Otoko nante nanisa (1966) - Miki
Abashiri bangaichi: Kettô reika 30 do (1967) - Michiko
Kigeki: Kyûkô ressha (1967)
Kawachi yûkyôden (1967) - Miyo Sugimoto
Maruhi toruko buro (1968)
Ôoku emaki (1968) - Omachi
Ah, yokaren (1968)
Iro (1969) - Hatsue Uehara
Zatoichi Goes to the Fire Festival (1970) - Okiyo
Keiken (1970)
Kigeki Kaiun ryokô (1971)
Furyo bancho te haccho kuchi haccho (1971)
Erotica iro-gassen (1972) - Geisha
Gokumon-to (1977) - Sanae - Chimata's Cousin
Shogun's Samurai (1978) - Izumo no Okuni
Hi no tori (1978) - Hinaku
Talk of the Town Tora-san (1978) - Sanae
Sekando rabu (1983) - Kazumi Hyuga
Izakaya Chōji (1983) - Sayo Kamiya
Ohan (1984) - Okayo
Tora-san's Forbidden Love (1984) - Fujiko Tominaga
Big Joys, Small Sorrows (1986) - Asako
Shôrishatachi (1992) - Keiko Kunitomo

Television
Taiyō ni Hoero! (1973, NTV, Guest) - Kyoko Harada
NHK Taiga drama
Katsu Kaishū (1974)
Sanga Moyu (1984)
Kasuga no Tsubone (1989) - Ofuku
Tokugawa Yoshinobu (1998) - Ren

References

External links

JMDb Profile (in Japanese)

1946 births
2009 deaths
Japanese actresses
Taiga drama lead actors
People with Guillain–Barré syndrome